Woodbridge Senior High School is a public secondary school located in Lake Ridge (north-west of Woodbridge), Prince William County, Virginia, United States.

History
The school was founded in 1964 in the Marumsco Hills Subdivision due to extensive development of the Woodbridge community, by Cecil D. Hylton. Classes were originally held at 2201 York Drive (now Woodbridge Middle School).  Classes moved to the current building (3001 Old Bridge Road) in 1974.  The first class to graduate having attended the full four years at the current building was the class of 1978.

Geography
Woodbridge Senior High School is located at  (34.683826, -105.386308).  Woodbridge High School is of similar design as nearby Gar-Field High School, which was also built in the mid-1970s.

Administration 
The principal of Woodbridge Senior High School is Heather Abney.

Curriculum, programs, and student achievement
In 2013 the school had a focus on engineering. Michael Alison Chandler of The Washington Post wrote that year that Woodbridge "had a good academic reputation" and that it "is well known for its fine arts program."

The school established the engineering introduction program Project Lead The Way.

In 2008, Newsweek Magazine ranked Woodbridge 44th on its annual list of "Best High Schools in America."

Student life
Homecoming is an honored tradition at Woodbridge and "Spirit Week" is part of the Homecoming celebration. Each of the five days has a different theme. The themes for "Spirit Week" are chosen by the Student Activities Leadership Council.  On Friday of "Spirit Week", the Pep Rally is held in the football stadium allowing all the students and faculty to watch or participate.  The Homecoming Parade is later held that afternoon, usually going down Antietam Road to the school.  The Homecoming Parade floats made by clubs/organizations from the school.  Later that Friday evening, the Homecoming Game is held at the WSHS football field and the Homecoming rock and banner winners are announced, as well as the Homecoming King and Queen. The Homecoming Dance is then held on the Saturday night of Spirit Week,

Programs
Woodbridge is one of two high schools in Prince William County to host Project Lead The Way (PLTW), the other being Patriot High School. The school offers some of PLTW's engineering courses, including:

 Introduction to Engineering Design
 Principles of Engineering
 Digital Electronics, and
 Civil Engineering and Architecture

The school also used to be home to the Center for Fine and Performing Arts (CFPA) until 2016, when the program was officially moved to the newly constructed Colgan High School. Because of this, the class of 2017 was the last graduating class to contain students who had been a part of the CFPA at Woodbridge.

Demographics
In 2013 it had 2,830 students, one of the largest such figures in the schools in Prince William County. In 2013 the student body became plurality white as ethnic diversity increased.

In the 2017-2018 school year, Woodbridge's student body was:
22.3% Black/African American
33.6% Hispanic 
29.3% White
7.7% Asian
6.8% Two or More Races
.3% American Indian/Alaskan
.2% Hawaiian/Pacific Islander

When the school was established the students were majority white.

Athletics
Chandler stated in 2013 that the school had "a strong sports program".

Notable alumni

Hala Ayala, politician
Joey Cook, contestant of American Idol XIV
Russell Davis, former NFL football player (Pittsburgh Steelers)
John Driscoll, actor
Da'Shawn Hand, NFL football player (Detroit Lions)
R. Alan King, U.S. Army veteran and author
Matt Lehr, former NFL football player
Tony Lilly, former NFL football player (Denver Broncos)
Kris McCray, MMA fighter
Raphiael Putney (born 1990), basketball player for Maccabi Haifa of the Israeli National League
Michael Edwards, MLS player (Colorado Rapids)

See also
 Official Website
 Prince William County Public Schools
 Woodbridge High School Profile
 Woodbridge High School Data

References

Educational institutions established in 1964
Public high schools in Virginia
Schools in Prince William County, Virginia
Northern Virginia Scholastic Hockey League teams
1964 establishments in Virginia
Woodbridge, Virginia